Fulton House is a former cold storage warehouse converted into a residential building at Wolf Point, Chicago.

Fulton House was built in 1898 by Frank B. Abbott as a 15-story warehouse structure. In 1908, the building was converted to a cold storage warehouse with an addition of a section to the north and a 16th floor. The split of the original south section and newer north section can be seen from the outside by a large crack on the exterior wall as well as a few details on the facade.

The building's fame came from the conversion as a residential building by Harry Weese from 1979 to 1981. The 16 story building now contains 106 residential condo/lofts located at 345 North Canal Street. Once in a run down neighborhood, the area is now under renewal and revival.

Gallery

See also
Fulton House's more famous neighbors:
 Merchandise Mart
 Apparel Center

Fulton House is one of a few successful building conversions in North America. Queen's Quay Terminal is  a former cold storage facility converted as a successful and popular commercial and residential complex along Toronto's waterfront.

References
 http://www.glasssteelandstone.com/BuildingDetail/1050.php
 http://www.chicagocondodirectory.com/loft-condos/fulton-house-lofts.html
 Emporis.com

Residential condominiums in Chicago
Commercial buildings completed in 1908
Renaissance Revival architecture in Illinois
1908 establishments in Illinois